Bella Caledonia is an online magazine publishing social, political and cultural commentary. It was launched in 2007 and came to particular prominence during the campaign period of the Scottish independence referendum that was held in 2014. The site is not affiliated to any political party. Until late 2017, it also produced a 24-page print magazine which appeared as a supplement in The National on the first Saturday of every month.

History
In October 2007, writers Mike Small and Kevin Williamson launched Bella Caledonia at the Radical Book Fair in Edinburgh. The site provided some robust political commentary and explored ideas of self-determination. It was named after a character from Alasdair Gray's novel Poor Things. Gray later provided the site with a new version of his artwork.

By 2011, the magazine was gaining more recognition for its content and The List ranked it highly in a feature about top Scottish websites. During the discussions and debates that took place as part of the Scottish independence referendum, the site published commentary and arguments that helped the Yes Scotland campaign. By 2014 the site was being read by 40,000 people daily. In the run up to Scottish independence referendum, international interest grew and Bella Caledonia had more than 500,000 unique users a month, with a peak of one million in August. A "Songs for Scotland" event was organised at the Òran Mór in Glasgow in September 2014, along with an album of music that could be downloaded.

In 2015, the site was named as one of the top 10 political blogs in the UK by Cision. By this point the site was moving from a citizen journalism model along the lines of De Correspondent, now trying to accommodate more contributions from freelance writers and engaging in journalistic collaboration. In 2015 the website began to publish articles that were written in Gaelic and in Scots.

In January 2017 the site announced that it was facing closure due to running costs and launched an urgent fundraising appeal. The magazine's advisory board met days later and resolved to continue publishing, agreeing upon a plan for a complete restructure- closing as a company and becoming a media collective.

In March 2017, it began producing a 24-page supplement for The National, to appear in the edition on the first Saturday of each month.

In November 2021, just weeks following the murder of the MP David Amess, the website was heavily criticised for publishing on Twitter the whereabouts of the UK Home Secretary, Priti Patel. The Tweet said: "BREAKING NEWS: UK Home Secretary Priti Patel is at a public event at the Hilton Grosvenor in the West End tonight (Friday). 1-9 Grosvenor Terrace, Glasgow G12 0TA. Do with that what you will". Bella Caledonia has since deleted the tweet.

References

External links

2007 establishments in Scotland
Political magazines published in the United Kingdom
Magazines established in 2007
Online magazines published in Scotland